Pyerun Patera is a patera, or a complex crater with scalloped edges, on Jupiter's moon Io. It is named after the Slavonic god of thunder, Pyerun. The name was adopted by the International Astronomical Union in 1985. West of Pyerun Patera is Mithra Patera, and to the east is the mesa Epaphus Mensa. To the northeast is Epaphus Mensa, and to the northwest are the mountain Silpium Mons and Svarog Patera.

References

Surface features of Io (moon)